The Rural Municipality of Glen Bain No. 105 is a rural municipality (RM) in the Canadian province of Saskatchewan within Census Division No. 3 and  Division No. 3. It is located in the south-central portion of the province.

History 
The RM of Glen Bain No. 105 incorporated as a rural municipality on December 11, 1911.

Geography

Communities and localities 
The following unincorporated communities are within the RM.

Localities
Arbuthnot, dissolved as a village
Esme
Glen Bain
Royer
St. Boswells

Demographics 

Government 
The RM of Glen Bain No. 105 is governed by an elected municipal council and an appointed administrator that meets on the second Tuesday of every month. The reeve of the RM is Ted Wornath while its administrator is Audrey Rotheisler. The RM's office is located in Glen Bain.

See also 
Saskatchewan Association of Rural Municipalities
List of rural municipalities in Saskatchewan

References 

G

Division No. 3, Saskatchewan